Sorin Marcel Socaciu (born April 23, 1972 in Mociu) is a former Romanian rugby union player. He played as a prop.

Club career
During his career, Socaciu played for Rovigo Delta in Italy, Tarbes, Périgueux and Belvès, all in France.

International career
Socaciu gathered 34 caps for Romania, from his debut in 2000 to his last game in 2006. He was a member of his national side for the 5th and 6th  Rugby World Cups in 1999 and 2003. At the 2003 World Cup he played three matches against Ireland, Wallabies and Namibia.

References

External links
 
 
 

1972 births
Living people
Romanian rugby union players
Romania international rugby union players
Rugby union props
Rugby Rovigo Delta players
Tarbes Pyrénées Rugby players
CA Périgueux players
People from Cluj County
Expatriate rugby union players in Italy
Expatriate rugby union players in France